Sky News Business Channel (also known as Sky News Money during primetime and Sky News Real Estate on Saturdays) was an Australian pay television business news channel, available nationally on the Foxtel subscription platform and via mobile through Foxtel Go.

It was owned by Australian News Channel, which also owns news-focused sister channel Sky News Australia.

History

Australian News Channel (ANC) announced it was to launch Australia's first national business channel in 2008, at the onset of the Global Financial Crisis. It was officially launched on 31 January 2008 at the Australian Securities Exchange. Sky News Business would utilise and simulcast content from Fox Business Network in the United States. In turn, Fox Business Network would air coverage from Sky News Business in order to provide Australian financial news coverage to American audiences.

The channel would also utilise the resources of the Sky UK Business News service in the UK, and Reuters Television. At launch, it was claimed the channel would include 16 hours of locally produced content daily.

James Daggar-Nickson was the business editor and channel manager of Sky News Business.

On 19 January 2016, the channel launched a high-definition simulcast feed.

In June 2018, it was announced that ANC would enter into a joint venture with the Nine Network to create Your Money, a business news channel that replaced the Sky News Business Channel on Foxtel channel 601 and also be available free-to-air through Nine on channel 95 in metropolitan markets and Darwin and also on channel 85 in the Northern NSW market and the Gold Coast. Sky News Business ceased broadcasting at 8:30 pm Eastern on 29 September 2018, ahead of its relaunch as Your Money at 6:00 am Eastern on 1 October 2018. Promotional trailers for Your Money were shown on the channel during the long break time.

Programming
Sky News Business Channel consisted of live rolling coverage of and analysis of the ASX and international markets, finance and economic news and personal investment trends throughout the day on weekdays, with replays of analysis or specialty programs after 9:30pm AEST weeknights and all weekend.

From 6 July 2015, the channel ran a programming block titled Sky News Money between 6:30pm and 6am weeknights.

From 2016, the channel ran another programming block titled Sky News Real Estate on Saturdays, broadcasting rolling coverage of live auctions, property advice and listings for six hours from 8:30am Sydney time. Hosted by Sophie Hull and James Treble, the programming was produced in conjunction with REA Group (a fellow News Corp Australia company).

 First Business
 Trading Day
 Lunch Money
 At The Close
 Market Day
 Market Moves
 MediaWeek
 Business Agenda
 The Perrett Report
 Switzer
 Your Money Your Call
 Business Night
 RatesLIVE
 Business View
 Business Success
 Business Class
 LawTV
 Market Express
 On The Record with Carson Scott
 Read and Profit
 Rates Reaction
 Social Business
 The Week in Business
 Sunday Business

Special programming
On 25 April 2015 the Sky News Business Channel aired an episode of American series 20/20 in simulcast with U.S. network ABC, featuring an interview with Caitlyn Jenner (then Bruce).

Availability

Reception
Sky News Business Channel was Australia's only business and finance focused news channel. Foreign business news channels CNBC and Bloomberg Television are also available on the Foxtel platform.

Sky News Business reaches close to 268,000 different people on average each week, with 72% of viewers being male, 28% of Sky News Business viewers are people 40-54 and 38% aged 55–69.

Bureaus
At launch, Sky News Business' studio was located within the Sky News centre at Foxtel's headquarters in the Sydney suburb of Macquarie Park. Sky News Business also used the resources of the Sky News network of bureaus and reporters across Australia and New Zealand.

At the start of 2018, the channel relocated its studios to the News Corp Australia headquarters. The new studio was subsequently used by the channel's successor, Your Money.

It was common for Sky News Business reporters to report from Exchange Square, within the headquarters of the Australian Securities Exchange for ASX updates, as well as outside the Reserve Bank of Australia in Martin Place, Sydney when news was expected from the Reserve Bank.

Third party crosses
Sky News Business had live camera links to Australia's major financial institutions. The channel featured regular breaking news, commentary and analysis from leading Australian economists, fund managers, brokers and analysts at ANZ, National Australia Bank, Westpac and Commonwealth Bank.

Sky News Business also had live camera links to various financial institutions in which it has commercial arrangements.

Notable presenters

Current presenters
 Sophie Hull — Sky News Real Estate
 James Treble — Sky News Real Estate
Leanne Jones
Ingrid Willinge
James Dagger-Nickson
 Peter Switzer

Former presenters
 Brooke Corte, now with sister channel Sky News Live
 Ahron Young, now with sister channel Sky News Live
 Janine Perrett — The Perrett Report, now with sister channel Sky News Live
Helen Dalley
Carson Scott

See also
 Sky News Live, sister channel of Sky News Business Channel and primary channel of Australian News Channel Pty Ltd.
 Your Money, this channel replaced Sky News Business Channel, a 50/50 joint venture of Australian News Channel Pty Ltd and Nine Entertainment Co. via Australian Money Channel Pty Ltd and it also replaced Extra.

Notes

References

Sky News Australia
Television networks in Australia
Defunct television channels in Australia
Business-related television channels
24-hour television news channels in Australia
Television channels and stations established in 2008
Television channels and stations disestablished in 2018
English-language television stations in Australia
2008 establishments in Australia
2018 disestablishments in Australia